Get The F*ck Out Of My House  (often shortened to GTFOOMH) is a reality television show originally launched in the Netherlands on RTL 5 on October 3, 2016, where it was produced by FremantleMedia owned, BlueCircle.

In the show, 100 complete strangers cram into an average sized family home in the bid to become the last person standing and win a jackpot prize, while continuously watched by television cameras.

Versions
 Currently airing
 An upcoming season
 Series was cancelled

See also

 List of television show franchises

References

External links
 Get The F*ck Out Of My House on Fremantlemedia
 RTL site

2010s Dutch television series
Reality television series franchises
Television franchises
Television series by Fremantle (company)

pt:A Casa